The 2022–23 season is Glentoran's 122nd season in the top flight of the Northern Ireland Football League having never been relegated since the leagues formation in 1890.  In addition to the domestic league, they will also compete in the Irish Cup, the League Cup and the County Antrim Shield.

Pre-season and friendlies 
Glentoran played a total of eight pre-season friendlies including one against Rangers B. Their results are shown in the table below.

Competitions

Overall Record

Transfers

In

Out

Out on loan

References 

Glentoran F.C. seasons
Glentoran